The LG Intuition is a cell phone manufactured by LG Electronics. It is Verizon's version of the LG Optimus Vu. It is considered by some to be a phablet due to its 5-inch screen size. Its operating system is Android 4.0.4. The phone is rootable. CyanogenMod, an operating system is as of yet incompatible with the phone.

References 

LG Electronics smartphones
Android (operating system) devices
Discontinued smartphones